Pendli Pilupu is a 1961 Indian Telugu-language drama film, produced by D. Bhavanarayana and directed by A. V. Seshagiri Rao. It stars N. T. Rama Rao and Devika with music composed by K. Prasada Rao. Pendli Pilupu and Indrajeet released on the same day, both starring Rama Rao.

Plot 
The film begins with Anasuyamma (Kannamba) moving to Pushkara Snanam a sacred bath at the seashore, with her daughter Radha, brother's children Raghu & Madhu, where Radha is lost due to Madhu's fault for which Anasuyamma neck outs him. Radha is adopted by a couple, Siva Rao (K. V. S. Sarma) & his wife (Hemalatha), and changes her name to Anuradha. Years roll by, and fortunately, Anuradha (Devika) & Madhu (N. T. Rama Rao) studied in the same college and both of them fall in love. Meanwhile, Madhu's brother & sister-in-law die in an accident. So, Madhu returns and starts taking care of his aunt & brother's son. Parallelly, Anasuyamma's Lawyer Ranganatham (C.S.R.) cheats a woman Simhachalam (Suryakantham) in his youth who meets him after a long time, stating that they are having a daughter Bala (Girija) and asks him to own them. Here Ranganatham's ploy is to create Bala as Anasuyamma's mislaid daughter Radha and keeps his assistant Bhagavanlu (Relangi) as her trainer when they love each other. On the other side, Siva Rao has to repay some amount to Anasuyamma; to collect it, Madhu reaches their village where he is surprised to see Anuradha. Anasuyamma too arrives there and starts liking Anuradha. After that, Ranganatham successfully plants Bala in the place of Radha. Now Anasuyamma asks Madhu to marry her, but he refuses, out of anger, Anasuyamma troubles Siva Rao for the debt. Here Anuradha pleads to Anasuyamma to relieve her father when she orders to get rid of Madhu's life. So, Anuradha persuades Madhu to marry Bala. Nityanandam (Peketi Sivaram) friend of Madhu and cousin of Anuradha, rushes to the marriage seeing the wedding card where he spots a childhood photo of Radha and recognizes her as Anuradha. At the same time, Bhagavanlu also finds out about the cheating of Ranganatham & Simhachalam and starts abusing them, they lock him in a room and go to the venue. But Bhagavanlu breaks out and stops the marriage. Eventually, Nityanandam also arrives with the proof, when Anasuyamma realizes the truth. Finally, Ranganatham & Simhachalam get arrested and the movie ends with the marriages of Madhu & Anuradha and Bhagavanlu & Bala.

Cast 
N. T. Rama Rao as Madhu
Devika as Radha / Anuradha
Relangi as Bhagavanlu
C.S.R. as Lawyer Ranganadham
Peketi Sivaram as Nityanandam
K. V. S. Sarma as Siva Rao
Kannamba as Anasuyamma
Suryakantham as Simhachalam
Girija as Bala
Hemalatha as Siva Rao's wife
Nirmalamma

Soundtrack 
Music composed by K. Prasada Rao.

References

External links 
 

1960s Telugu-language films
1961 drama films
Indian drama films
Films scored by K. Prasada Rao